Dóra Vass (born 1991) is a Hungarian rhythmic gymnast, and coach.

She competed at the 2007 World Rhythmic Gymnastics Championships, 2009 World Rhythmic Gymnastics Championships, 2010 World Rhythmic Gymnastics Championships, 2011 World Rhythmic Gymnastics Championships, 2013 World Rhythmic Gymnastics Championships, 2014 Rhythmic Gymnastics European Championships, and 2015 Rhythmic Gymnastics World Championships.

References

External links 
 Official website
Hungary's Dora Vass takes part in a training session for the Rhythmic Gymnastics test event at the Rio Olympic Arena

Hungarian rhythmic gymnasts
Living people

1991 births
Place of birth missing (living people)